Wolfforth is a small town located in Lubbock County. The town was named for 2 brothers, George Wolffarth who was a rancher in the area, and Eastin Wolffarth who was Lubbock County Sherriff around 1900. The population was 3,670 at the 2010 census.

History
Wolfforth was established in 1916, and developed as a railroad town when the Panhandle and Santa Fe Railway built through the area. The city is named after "Tildy" Wolffarth (né George Clarence Wolffarth; 1866–1950) and wife, Charlotte Lottie Alma Hunt (maiden; 1879–1952), early settlers.

Geography

Wolfforth is located at  (33.503968, –102.011973).

Demographics

2020 census

As of the 2020 United States census, there were 5,521 people, 1,771 households, and 1,313 families residing in the city.

2000 census
As of the census of 2000, there were 2,554 people, 900 households, and 723 families residing in the city. The population density was 1,700.6 people per square mile (657.4/km). There were 972 housing units at an average density of 647.2/sq mi (250.2/km). The racial makeup of the city was 85.47% White, 1.29% African American, 0.16% Native American, 0.23% Asian, 12.06% from other races, and 0.78% from two or more races. Hispanic or Latino of any race were 22.71% of the population.

There were 900 households, out of which 43.6% had children under the age of 18 living with them, 61.3% were married couples living together, 15.4% had a female householder with no husband present, and 19.6% were non-families. 16.7% of all households were made up of individuals, and 7.1% had someone living alone who was 65 years of age or older. The average household size was 2.79 and the average family size was 3.12.

In the city, the population was spread out, with 29.9% under the age of 18, 8.3% from 18 to 24, 32.2% from 25 to 44, 20.1% from 45 to 64, and 9.5% who were 65 years of age or older. The median age was 33 years. For every 100 females, there were 89.9 males. For every 100 females age 18 and over, there were 87.1 males.

The median income for a household in the city was $37,465, and the median income for a family was $40,694. Males had a median income of $30,461 versus $20,990 for females. The per capita income for the city was $16,567. About 12.4% of families and 15.1% of the population were below the poverty line, including 16.7% of those under age 18 and 22.0% of those age 65 or over.

Education
Wolfforth is served by the Frenship Independent School District. Frenship ISD has a total of fourteen schools. Four schools are located in Wolfforth, nine in the city of Lubbock, and one in Lubbock County.

Transportation
US 62/US 82, also known as the Marsha Sharp Freeway, runs through Wolfforth, bypassing the town to the south. Farm to Market Road 179, also known as Dowden Road, is the main north–south highway through the town. Loop 193, also known as Main Street, runs through the town, acting as a business loop for US 62/82.

References

External links
 City of Wolfforth official website
 Frenship Independent School District
 Texas State Historical Association
Photos of West Texas and the Llano Estacado

Cities in Lubbock County, Texas
Cities in Texas
Lubbock metropolitan area
1916 establishments in Texas